NGC 6054 is a barred lenticular galaxy located about 460 million light-years away in the constellation Hercules. It was discovered by astronomer Lewis Swift on June 27, 1886. It was then rediscovered by astronomer Guillaume Bigourdan on June 1, 1888. PGC 57073 is often misidentified as NGC 6054.  NGC 6054 is a member of the Hercules Cluster.

See also
 List of NGC objects (6001–7000)

References

External links

 http://ngcicproject.org/NGC/NGC_60xx/NGC_6054.htm 
 http://www.astronomy-mall.com/Adventures.In.Deep.Space/NGC%206000%20-%206999%20(11-30-17).htm

6054
57086
Hercules (constellation)
Hercules Cluster
Astronomical objects discovered in 1886
Barred lenticular galaxies
IC objects
10192